Johann Lafer (born September 27, 1957, in Sankt Stefan im Rosental, Styria, Austria) is an Austrian chef living in Germany.

Johann Lafer became well known through his TV cooking show and his numerous cookbooks. His television show is self-produced.

He was a regular guest of the television host Markus Lanz, in whose show he regularly prepared meals in front of an audience.

He lives with his wife Silvia and two children Jennifer and Jonathan in a little village called Guldental. He also operates a cooking school in Guldental.

Lafer acts as a pilot in his Helicopter dining program.

Achievements
 In 1997 Johann was named "Chef of the Year" by "Gault Millau"
 In 2006 he was given a star by "Guide Michelin".
 Produces his own cooking show on television.
Started a pilot project for healthy eating in schools (food@ucation)
Runs his cooking school in Guldental

References

External links
 Homepage of Johann Lafer (in German)
 Who´s Who of Chefs (in German)
 Lafer! Lichter! Lecker! (TV Show)
 Johann Lafer Infos (in German)

1957 births
Living people
Austrian chefs
German chefs
German television chefs
Austrian expatriates in Germany
ZDF people